Spin is the first solo album released by former Savage Garden vocalist Darren Hayes. The album was produced by Walter Afanasieff and mixed by Chris Lord-Alge. It was released in Australia in March 2002 and reached the rest of the world later that year.

Background
Hayes, continuing the trend from his years as Savage Garden's frontman, addresses romance on almost every track on the album. Walter Afanasieff, who had already worked on Savage Garden's Affirmation, oversaw the production of the majority of the album, with help from co-producers Greg Bieck, Rick Nowels and Robert Conley. Afanasieff produced five of the twelve tracks on the original release: "Insatiable", "Heart Attack", "Dirty", "Good Enough" and the title track, "Spin"; Bieck produced "Strange Relationship" and "I Miss You"; Nowels produced "Creepin' Up on You", "I Can't Ever Get Enough of You", "Like It or Not" and "What You Like"; and Conley solely produced the track "Crush (1980 Me)". Afanasieff also produced the Australian-release bonus track, "The Heart Wants What It Wants", and the UK collector's edition bonus tracks, "I Wish U Heaven" and "Can't Help Falling in Love".  the album sold 118,000 units in the United States.

Singles

"Insatiable" became the album's lead single in January 2002, becoming a hit in several places across the globe. Some consider this to be Hayes' signature song, as it is his highest-selling single of all time. The single came backed with new B-sides "Falling at Your Feet" and "Ride", plus mixes of the track from Calderone, Pablo La Rosa, Specificus, DP and the Metro Boys.

"Strange Relationship" became the album's second single in June 2002, but it was not a hit like its predecessor. The single came backed with the new B-side "So Bad", remixes by DP and Specificus, the Metro Boys remix and Capital Radio Session of "Insatiable". It included a cover of the Marvin Gaye song "Sexual Healing", Hayes' second cover of a song by the artist, having participated in the 2001 Artists Against AIDS Worldwide recording of the song.

"I Miss You" became the album's third single in November 2002. It was not released in Australia until February 2003. The single includes the new B-sides "In Your Eyes" (a cover of the Peter Gabriel track featured on the UK and European versions) and "Where You Want to Be", plus a remix by Dallas Austin, the instrumental version, an acoustic version of "Insatiable", the F3 remix of "Strange Relationship", and the "Crush on Holiday" remix of "Crush" (1980 Me). The Dallas Austin remix became the main airplay and video version in Australia.

"Crush (1980 Me)" became the album's fourth and final single in April 2003. However, it was released in September 2002 in Australia, prior to the release of "I Miss You" in that country. The single includes the new B-side "Right Dead Back on It", remixes by Mayday Biscuit Disco and "Crush on Holiday", the instrumental version, plus an Acoustic version of "Insatiable", the F3 remix of "Strange Relationship", and the Dallas Austin mix of "I Miss You". The "Crush on Holiday" mix is a mash-up with Madonna's 1983 single "Holiday". This version became the main airplay and video version in Australia.

Track listing

Other tracks

During the Spin recording sessions, a number of tracks were left over, included as B-sides or completely unreleased. Although certain tracks were marketed as demo recordings, all appear to be the complete, final studio recordings. A total of fifteen tracks, excluding remixes, are listed.

 Demo recordings:
 "Falling at Your Feet" – Available as a B-side to "Insatiable" in both the UK and Australia.
 "Ride" – Available as a B-side to "Insatiable" in both the UK and Australia.
 "So Bad" – Available as a B-side to "Strange Relationship" in both the UK and Australia.
 "Where You Want to Be" – Available as a B-side to "I Miss You" in both the UK and Australia, also included as one of three tracks unlocked on Hayes' official website using the enhanced content on the initial release of Spin.
 "Right Dead Back on It" – Available as a B-side to "Crush (1980 Me)" in Australia only. After 15,000 copies of the single were pressed, the track was removed for unknown copyright reasons, and new copies were pressed without it.
 Covers:
 "Sexual Healing" – Available as B-side to "Strange Relationship" in the UK only, cover of the Marvin Gaye original. The song was recorded as part of a Capital Radio Session, which also featured a demo recording of "Insatiable".
 "In Your Eyes" – Available as a B-side to "I Miss You" in the UK only, cover of the Peter Gabriel original. The song was recorded for intention of use on Spin, however, it was cut when Hayes claimed he wanted "all original material".
 "I Wish U Heaven" – Available as a bonus track on the UK collector's edition of Spin, cover of the Prince original. The recording only lasts 2:14, and only includes up to the second chorus of the song.
 "Can't Help Falling in Love" – Available as a bonus track on the UK collector's edition of Spin, cover of the Elvis Presley original. The recording only lasts 2:22, and only includes up to the second chorus of the song.
 Bonus tracks:
 "When You Say You Love Me" – Available as one of three tracks unlocked on Hayes' official website using the enhanced content on the initial release of Spin. The song was later covered by Australian band Human Nature for their album Walk the Tightrope, and Clay Aiken for his album Measure of a Man. Hayes also recorded a collaborative version of the song with Human Nature for their greatest hits album "A Symphony of Hits".
 "Lift Me Up" – Available as one of three tracks unlocked on Hayes' official website using the enhanced content on the initial release of Spin. The song was later covered by the Backstreet Boys, due for inclusion on their fifth studio album, Never Gone, and also considered for release on the follow-up album Unbreakable. However, their version remains unreleased. Hayes later recorded a collaborative version of the song with Olivia Newton-John for her duets album (2).
 "The Heart Wants What It Wants" – Included as a bonus track on the standard edition of Spin exclusively in Australia and Japan. The track was never released in the United Kingdom, despite being listed by some retailers as the B-side to "Crush (1980 Me)" before its commercial release. The track also appears on the Australian tour edition of Spin.
 Unreleased tracks:
 "Breath" – Leaked to the internet in 2004. "Breath" is the only unreleased track which has never been altered or changed and then commercially released. It was intended as the lead single from the collector's edition of Spin, but was scrapped for unknown reasons.
 "Believe" – Leaked to the internet in 2004. "Believe" is a solo version of the song "Do You Believe", which Hayes recorded as a duet with Specificus for their EP "Specificus" in 2002. The solo version features a slight lyrical and a completely different musical arrangement.
 "Ocean" – Leaked to the internet in 2004. "Ocean" was later re-worked and released as the digital B-side to Hayes' 2007 single "On the Verge of Something Wonderful". Only minor differences exist between the two versions.

Charts

Weekly charts

Year-end charts

Certifications and sales

References

2002 debut albums
Darren Hayes albums
Albums produced by Walter Afanasieff
Columbia Records albums